Ka’dar Chaz Hollman (born September 18, 1994) is an American football cornerback for the Houston Texans of the National Football League (NFL). He played college football at Toledo.

Hollman graduated from Burlington Township High School in 2013 and attended Milford Academy in an effort to earn the SAT scores he needed for college.

College career
Hollman played college football at the University of Toledo and first joined the team as a walk on. He played in 40 games totaling 113 tackles and 2 interceptions. Was a nominee for the Burlsworth Trophy awarded to the best player in the nation who started his career as a walk on.

Professional career

Green Bay Packers
Hollman was drafted by the Green Bay Packers in the sixth round (185th overall) of the 2019 NFL Draft. On May 3, 2019, he signed his rookie contract with the Packers.

Houston Texans
On August 23, 2021, Hollman was traded to the Houston Texans for a 2022 seventh round pick. He was waived on August 31, 2021.

New Orleans Saints
On September 6, 2021, Hollman was signed to the New Orleans Saints practice squad. He was released on September 28.

New York Giants
On October 5, 2021, Hollman was signed to the New York Giants practice squad. On December 7, 2021, Hollman was placed on practice squad/injured list.

San Francisco 49ers
On February 2, 2022, Hollman signed a reserve/future contract with the San Francisco 49ers. He was waived on August 28, 2022.

Atlanta Falcons
On August 31, 2022, Hollman signed with the practice squad of the Atlanta Falcons. He was released on October 11.

San Francisco 49ers (second stint)
On October 18, 2022, Hollman was signed to the San Francisco 49ers practice squad. He was released on November 29.

Miami Dolphins
On December 14, 2022, Hollman was signed to the Miami Dolphins practice squad.

Houston Texans
On January 26, 2023, Hollman signed a reserve/future contract with the Houston Texans.

NFL career statistics

Regular season

References

External links

Toledo Rockets bio
Atlanta Falcons bio

1994 births
Living people
People from Burlington Township, New Jersey
Players of American football from New Jersey
Sportspeople from Burlington County, New Jersey
American football cornerbacks
Toledo Rockets football players
Green Bay Packers players
Houston Texans players
New Orleans Saints players
Milford Academy alumni
New York Giants players
San Francisco 49ers players
Atlanta Falcons players